WYEP-FM (91.3 MHz) is a listener-supported non-commercial radio station in Pittsburgh, Pennsylvania.  It carries an Adult Album Alternative (AAA) radio format and is run by the Pittsburgh Community Broadcasting Corporation, along with 90.5 WESA. The studios and offices are on Bedford Square.  WYEP-FM holds periodic fundraisers to support the station.

WYEP-FM has an effective radiated power (ERP) of 18,000 watts.  The transmitter is on Longview Street in Pittsburgh.

History

WYEP began broadcasting on April 30, 1974, on 91.5 MHz. Prior to using its own frequency, the Pittsburgh Community Broadcasting Corporation (the licensee which was incorporated in 1972 solely for the purpose of building and operating a community based, non-commercial radio station) produced three hourly music and public affairs programs under agreement with WDUQ 90.5. The programs scheduled at 4 p.m. provided an example of the content WYEP would broadcast. The radio station studios were constructed by volunteers. It was located in the South Oakland area of Pittsburgh, 4 Cable Place, in a former police horse stable. In its early days, it was principally operated by volunteers knowledgeable in music or an area of public affairs.

In 1979, WYEP filed to move to 91.3 MHz and upgrade its signal to 18 kW. Transmission facilities were moved from atop the Cathedral of Learning on the University of Pittsburgh campus to a tower above the Monongahela River near Hazelwood. The move became effective in 1983 and also saw WIUP-FM 91.3 in Indiana move to 90.1. In 1987, the station reorganized and relocated their broadcast facility to the campus of Chatham University in Pittsburgh's East End. In 1994, the station moved to Birmingham Place on the South Side of Pittsburgh. In early 2006, the station began broadcasting from the new WYEP Community Broadcast Center, located in the Bedford Square section of Pittsburgh's South Side. In September 2006, the WYEP Community Broadcast Center received a LEED-NC Silver rating, making it environmentally friendly and "the first green station in the nation" .
In 2011, WYEP purchased the license for WDUQ from Duquesne University, and launched an NPR News and information format station, 90.5 WESA. The staff and management of 90.5 WESA were co-located at the Community Broadcast Center. In 2014, WYEP celebrated its 40th anniversary on the air.

In 2016, the boards of WYEP and WESA merged, becoming the Pittsburgh Community Broadcasting Corp.

WYEP broadcasts and streams music programming 24 hours a day.

See also

List of community radio stations in the United States

Notes

External links
 
 
 

YEP
NPR member stations
Community radio stations in the United States
Adult album alternative radio stations in the United States
Radio stations established in 1974
1974 establishments in Pennsylvania